Pablo Daniel Zeballos Ocampos (born 4 March 1986) is a Paraguayan football attacking midfielder. Zeballos represented the Paraguay national team from 2008 to 2012, featuring in the 2011 Copa América where Paraguay finished runners-up. In 2011, he was voted the Paraguayan Footballer of the Year.

Career

Sol de América
Zeballos started his career in the youth divisions of Sol de América where he played alongside José Ortigoza. He made his debut in 2005 and helped the team to win the Paraguayan División Intermedia tournament by being the team's top-scorer. He is remembered for his goal against Club Cerro Corá at the last minute of the match.

Loan to Oriente Petrolero
In 2006, Zeballos was transferred to Bolivian club Oriente Petrolero on a six-month loan period, where he became the top-scorer with 16 goals in 14 league appearances and helped the team reach second position during the 2006 Liga de Fútbol Profesional Boliviano Torneo Clausura.

Return to Sol de América
Zeballos returned to Paraguay for the 2007 season and finished as the joint top goal scorer of the Primera Division top-scorer, along with Fabio Ramos of Club Nacional, with 15 goals.

Cruz Azul
His good form rewarded him with a transfer to Cruz Azul of Mexico. He debuted against San Luis F.C. in the Jornada 3 of the Clausura 2008, making his first goal in the Primera División de México one minute after being substituted in for Nicolás Vigneri. In the liguilla del futbol Mexicano he brought the team back up to beat Jaguares in quarter-finals and took them all the way to the final where they would lose.

On 15 November 2008, Zeballos scored his first "hat-trick" with Cruz Azul against Jaguares.

Loan to Cerro Porteño 
In January 2010, Zeballos was loaned to Primera División Paraguaya club Cerro Porteño until 31 December 2010. With Cerro Porteño he won two second places and was top scorer of the Torneo Apertura with 16 goals along with Rodrigo Teixeira, and ended up being top scorer of the year with 24. On 12 December 2010, it was reported that former club Oriente Petrolero and various clubs from Bolivia's Liga de Fútbol Profesional had shown there interest in Zeballos.

Olimpia
At the end of that year, Zeballos signed a contract with rival of Cerro Porteno, Olimpia. Olimpia came up second during the Torneo Apertura 2011 with him as top scorer having scored 13 goals. On the next tournament of the year, Zeballos managed to win the Torneo Clausura with Olimpia, being the team's top scorer with 12 goals, one behind the tournament's top scorer Fredy Bareiro. With this record, Zeballos was top scorer of the 2011 season in Paraguay with a total of 25 goals, attracted on themselves the attention of Genoa and Cagliari.

Krylya Sovetov Samara
In the summer of 2012, Zeballos joined Russian Premier League side Krylia Sovetov Samara on a three-year contract. Zeballos made his debut for Krylya Sovetov in the 2012–13 Russian Premier League season in a 1–1 home draw against Terek Grozny on 22 July.

After 1 goal in 15 appearances in the first half of the season for Krylia Sovetov, Zeballos joined Ecuadorian side Emelec on a six-month loan deal till 30 June 2013, with the option of a permanent move.

Club Sport Emelec
He arrived to the Emelec, where he was loaned for a great sum of money, but only managed one goal during his time, for which he was criticized by the fans and the media that he wasn't worth the amount paid for. He left Emelec after just appearing in 17 games. Zeballos left Emelec to join Kyrlia again but this time with no success after long and exhausting negotiations during summer 2014 Zeballos returned to Club Olimpia, but by judicial problems he couldn't sign a contract and then started negotiations with Botafogo.

Botafogo
After a lot of negotiation Zeballos arrived at Rio de Janeiro to sign with Botafogo. He scored his first goal, of penalty, in a match of the Cariocão 2014 against Boavista.

Libertad
During December 2015, it had already been reported that Zeballos had a %99 chance of departing Olimpia. By 7 January 2016, it was announced that Zeballos had joined Club Libertad and the following day he had travelled to the city of Minga Guazú to join the club in their pre-season training.

River Plate Asunción
On 30 December 2020, it was confirmed that Zeballos signed with River Plate for the 2021 season, when the club would play in the Copa Sudamericana. Zaballos signed a two year agreement.

International career
On 29 February 2008, Zeballos was called up to the Paraguay national football team the first time for a friendly against Honduras. In June 2008, Zeballos was again called up to the national team for two 2010 FIFA World Cup qualification matches against Brazil and Bolivia. On 25 May 2011, Zeballos scored his first goal for Paraguay in a 4–2 away loss in a friendly against Argentina.

Career statistics

Club

International goals

Honours

Club
Sol de América
 División Intermedia: 2006

Olimpia
 Primera División: 2011 Clausura

Sportivo Ameliano
 Copa Paraguay: 2022

International
Paraguay
 Copa América runners-up: 2011

Individual
 Paraguayan Footballer of the Year: 2011
 Primera División de Paraguay topscorers: 2007 Torneo Apertura (15 goals), 2010 Torneo Apertura (16 goals)

See also
 Players and Records in Paraguayan Football

References

1986 births
Living people
Association football midfielders
Paraguayan footballers
Paraguayan expatriate footballers
Paraguay international footballers
Club Sol de América footballers
Oriente Petrolero players
Cruz Azul footballers
Cerro Porteño players
Club Olimpia footballers
PFC Krylia Sovetov Samara players
C.S. Emelec footballers
Al-Wakrah SC players
Botafogo de Futebol e Regatas players
Atlético Nacional footballers
Club Libertad footballers
Sportivo Luqueño players
12 de Octubre Football Club players
Paraguayan Primera División players
Liga MX players
Russian Premier League players
Campeonato Brasileiro Série A players
Categoría Primera A players
Ecuadorian Serie A players
Qatar Stars League players
Bolivian Primera División players
Expatriate footballers in Bolivia
Expatriate footballers in Brazil
Expatriate footballers in Colombia
Expatriate footballers in Ecuador
Expatriate footballers in Mexico
Expatriate footballers in Russia
Expatriate footballers in Qatar
Paraguayan expatriate sportspeople in Bolivia
Paraguayan expatriate sportspeople in Brazil
Paraguayan expatriate sportspeople in Colombia
Paraguayan expatriate sportspeople in Ecuador
Paraguayan expatriate sportspeople in Mexico
Paraguayan expatriate sportspeople in Russia
2011 Copa América players